Pilkuse Landscape Conservation Area is a nature park which is located in Rapla County, Estonia.

The area of the nature park is 480 ha.

The protected area was founded in 1992 to protect Pilkuse Bog and its biodiversity.

References

Nature reserves in Estonia
Geography of Rapla County